Wardija Tower, originally known as Torre della Guardia di Giorno and also known as Bubaqra Tower, is a small watchtower in the limits of Żurrieq, Malta. It was completed in June 1659 as the last of the thirteen De Redin towers.

Wardija Tower was the last coastal watchtower to be built on the main island of Malta. It is situated between Żurrieq and Ħal Far, with the nearest tower to it being Sciuta Tower to the west. The tower follows the standard design of the De Redin towers, having a square plan with two floors and a turret on the roof, but it is slightly smaller. It was originally armed with 2 cannons and 2 mortars. 

After the British period, the tower became abandoned and fell into disuse. In June 2022, the tower was restored by the Restoration Directorate, a scheme set up by the Żurrieq Local Council in order to carry out restoration projects on various sites in Żurrieq.

References

Further reading

External links

National Inventory of the Cultural Property of the Maltese Islands

De Redin towers
Towers completed in 1659
Żurrieq
National Inventory of the Cultural Property of the Maltese Islands
1659 establishments in Malta